Southern Launch (incorporated as SouthernLaunch.space Pty Ltd) is an Australian space company providing infrastructure and logistics support for orbital and sub-orbital launches of satellites and space payloads.

Facilities
Southern Launch is developing two multi-user launch sites in South Australia:

Pending an environmental review and comment from local residents, the company intends that customers will be able to launch their rockets into orbit over the Great Australian Bight.

Rockets
In October 2019, Southern Launch signed an agreement with Perigee Aerospace of South Korea to use the Southern Launch rocket facilities from 2020.

In February 2020, the company signed a launch service provider contract with DEWC Systems to be the first company to launch a payload aboard a sub-orbital rocket at the recently announced Koonibba Test Range. The launch occurred on 19 September 2020.

References

Space technology
Private spaceflight companies
Aerospace companies of Australia